In Greek mythology, Anax (from earlier) was a king of Anactoria (Miletus). He was the son of Gaea (Earth) and father of Asterius. Anax' name means "tribal chief, lord, (military) leader".

Mythology 
According to the Milesians in Asia Minor, their land was called Anactoria for two generations, during the reigns of the eponymous founder Anax and his son Asterius who succeeded him in the throne. But later on, Miletus who was fleeing from King Minos, with a Cretan army in Anactoria, occupied the country and called it after himself.

See also 

 Anax (word)
 Anak
 Giants
 Anakim

Notes

References 

 Pausanias, Description of Greece with an English Translation by W.H.S. Jones, Litt.D., and H.A. Ormerod, M.A., in 4 Volumes. Cambridge, MA, Harvard University Press; London, William Heinemann Ltd. 1918. . Online version at the Perseus Digital Library
Pausanias, Graeciae Descriptio. 3 vols. Leipzig, Teubner. 1903.  Greek text available at the Perseus Digital Library.

Kings in Greek mythology
Children of Gaia
Demigods in classical mythology